Quarshie Godwin John is a Ghanaian politician and a member of the First Parliament of the fourth Republic
representing the Yilo Krobo constituency in Eastern Region of Ghana.

Early life and education 
Quarshie was born at Yilo Krobo in the Eastern Region of Ghana. He attended the Overseas Political Training Course and obtained his Diploma in political science.

Politics 
Quarshie was first elected into Parliament on the ticket of the National Democratic Congress for the Yilo Krobo Constituency in the Eastern Region of Ghana during the 1992 Ghanaian parliamentary election. He was defeated in the 1996 Ghanaian general election by Daniel Tekpertey who polled 22,688 votes out of the 100% valid votes cast representing 49.40% over his opponents Priscilla Esther Mensa Nee Krob who polled 6,482 votes representing 14.10%, Abayah Vicor Kwabla who polled 5,894 votes representing 2.80% and Lovelace Emmanuel Odonkor who polled 0 votes representing 0.00%.

Career 
Quarshie is a teacher by profession. He was a former member of Parliament for the Akropong constituency in the Eastern Region of Ghana.

References 

Living people
National Democratic Congress (Ghana) politicians
Ghanaian MPs 1993–1997
Ghanaian Christians
Ghanaian educators
People from Eastern Region (Ghana)
Year of birth missing (living people)